The Empress's Cup was a Japanese Woman's football competition that took place during the 1980 season.

Overview
Eight teams participated in the event, and Shimizudaihachi SC won the championship.

Results

Quarterfinals
FC Jinnan 2-0 Nishiyama High School
Kobe FC 2-1 Shimizu FC Mama
Shimizudaihachi SC 4-0 Yowa Ladies
Motohachi SS Mothers 0-12 Takatsuki FC

Semifinals
FC Jinnan 3-0 Kobe FC
Shimizudaihachi SC 1-0 Takatsuki FC

Final
FC Jinnan 0-2 Shimizudaihachi SC
Shimizudaihachi SC won the championship.

References

Empress's Cup
1980 in Japanese women's football